When Will It Stop is the third studio album by British rapper Giggs. It was released on October 11, 2013 via XL Recordings/Spare No1 Productions. The album features guest appearances from Anthony Hamilton, Ed Sheeran, Styles P and Kyze. When Will It Stop debuted at number 21 on the UK Albums Chart.

Track listing

Personnel
Nathaniel Thompson – main artist, executive producer
Edward Christopher Sheeran – featured artist & producer (track 4)
Anthony Cornelius Hamilton – featured artist (track 11)
David Styles – featured artist (track 12)
Kyze – featured artist (track 15)
Tali Aota – guitar (tracks: 4, 7), bass (track 7)
Matthew Virgo – producer (tracks: 1, 2)
Bayoz Musik – producer (tracks: 3, 16)
Jake Gosling – producer (track 4)
Jason "TRC" Lee – producer (track 5)
Ernest Anthony Price – producer (track 6)
Mark Daniel Ronson – producer (track 6)
Sleep Deez – producer (tracks: 7, 9)
Boom Productions – producer (tracks: 8, 14)
Pablo Productions – producer (tracks: 10, 15)
J.U.S.T.I.C.E. League – producers (track 11)
Carl "Universe" Dennis – producer (track 12), mixing, executive producer
Farhad Samadzada – producers (track 13)
Dukus Alemay – co-producer (track 7), mixing (tracks: 1-15), executive producer
Brian Knapp Gardner – mastering
Phil Lee – art direction & design
Hannah Blows – design
Robbie Blundell – design
Jeff Wack – illustration
Alex Lake – photography

Charts

References

2013 albums
XL Recordings albums
Giggs (rapper) albums
Albums produced by Mark Ronson
Albums produced by Jake Gosling
Albums produced by J.U.S.T.I.C.E. League